Microrape nivea is a moth of the family Megalopygidae. It was described by Walter Hopp in 1922. It is found in Bolivia.

The wingspan is 19–21 mm.

References

Moths described in 1922
Megalopygidae